The 1992 Mr. Olympia contest was an IFBB professional bodybuilding competition held on September 12, 1992, at the Helsinki Ice Hall in Helsinki, Finland.

Results
The total prize money awarded was $275,000.

Notable events
 Ronnie Coleman, a future champion, made his Mr. Olympia debut
 Lee Haney, an eight-time Mr. Olympia, retired

References

External links 
 Mr. Olympia
 1992 Mr. Olympia Top 6 Posedown (video)

 1992
1992 in Finnish sport
1992 in bodybuilding
Bodybuilding competitions in Finland
International sports competitions in Helsinki
1990s in Helsinki
September 1992 sports events in Europe